John Hollister may refer to:
 John B. Hollister (1890–1979), U.S. Representative from Ohio
 John C. Hollister (1818–?), Adjutant General of Connecticut
 John J. Hollister Jr. (1901–1961), agriculturalist, banker, and California state senator
 John W. Hollister (1869–1950), American football player and coach